S. princeps may refer to:
 Spondylus princeps, a bivalve mollusc species found off the coast of Ecuador
 Stephanorrhina princeps, the spotted flower beetle, a beetle species endemic to  Dedza province in Malawi
 Styringomyia princeps, a crane fly species in the genus Styringomyia